Malayan is a 2009 Tamil language film written and directed by M. P. Gopi. It stars Karan and Shammu, and Udhayathara, while Ganja Karuppu, Sarath Babu, Rajan P. Dev, Bala Singh, and Mayilsamy play supporting roles.

Cast
Karan as Malayan
Shammu
Udhayathara as Shenbagam
Ganja Karuppu
Sarath Babu as Meiyappan aka Annachi
Rajan P. Dev as Vedachalam
Bala Singh
Mayilsamy
Sakthi Kumar
Dheeraj Kher as Suraj Bihari

Soundtrack
The soundtrack was composed by Dhina.

Reception
Behindwoods wrote "Malayan is a good attempt which could have been done with some more grip towards the latter portions. Its raw and earthy treatment might work to its advantage in the B and C centers." Indiaglitz wrote "Malayan is your average commercial flick for most part, with Karan given the Himalayan responsibility of making it worth a watch. And he fairly succeeds." This film was Television premiered in SunTV on April 17' 2010 for weekend Saturday premier.

References

2009 films
2000s Tamil-language films